George LeMaire, born Meyer Goldstick, was a vaudeville comedian who appears in several films and worked as a director and producer for Pathé before his death in 1930. He was a "veteran straght man" who worked in comedy duos. His comedy partners included Eddie Cantor, Joe Phillips, and Louis Simon.

Rufus LeMaire was his brother.

On January 20, 1930, he died from a heart attack.

Theater
The Dream Girl (operetta), as William Addison
Ziegfeld Follies of 1919
George LeMaire's Broadway Brevities (1920)
George White's Scandals of 1922

Filmography
Blockade (1928 film), writer
Taxi 13 (1928), dialogue writer
At the Dentist's (1929)
Dancing Around (1929)
The Plumbers Are Coming (1929)
What A Day! (1929)
Barber's College (1930)
A Tight Squeeze (1930)
The New Waiter (1930), a George LeMaire Comedy
 The Seventh Commandment (1932)

References

External links

1930 deaths
Vaudeville performers